The Persija–PSM Makassar rivalry or also known as the Jakarta–Makassar rivalry is a term for the football rivalry that has brought together two big teams since the Perserikatan era namely Persija Jakarta which is based in Jakarta and PSM Makassar which is based in Makassar.

History
The rivalry between Persija Jakarta and PSM Makassar was first recorded in the 1951 PSSI National Championship, namely in 17 November at Surabaya. The last meeting record since 2022, Persija is superior, which is 23 to 15. The first goalscorers in the Rivalry between Persija and PSM Makassar were Andi Ramang from PSM Makassar (1951) and Mohammad Djamiat Dalhar from Persija (1954). Aggregate goals were still won by the team nicknamed Macan Kemayoran which is 71 goals compared to 56 goals scored Juku Eja.

The collection of titles for the two teams in domestic competitions, both the PSSI National Championship era, the Perserikatan period, to the Indonesian League, were relatively even. Persija won four times before independence: 1931, 1933, 1934, and 1938, then five times won the Perserikatan: 1953–54, 1962–64, 1971–73, 1973–75 and 1978–79. Meanwhile, PSM won six championship titles, namely in the 1955–57, 1957–59, 1964–65, 1965–66, 1991–92 and 1999–20 seasons. Then in the Indonesian League era, after the two competitions were Perserikatan, Perserikatan and Galatama in 1994, Persija lifted the trophy twice, namely in 2001 and 2018.

Meeting record

1999–20 Premier Division Semifinals
In the match between PSM Makassar and Persija Jakarta which took place in the 1999–2000 Premier Division Semifinals, PSM Makassar managed to win narrowly with a score of 1–0 over Persija Jakarta through goals scored by Miro Baldo Bento. At the end of the competition, PSM came out as champion after overcoming the resistance Pupuk Kaltim in the final with a score of 3–2.

2001 Bank Mandiri League Finals 
Persija Jakarta and PSM Makassar met again in the 2001 Bank Mandiri League final. PSM, who is the defending champion, appeared with the best strength, where at that time there were well-known names such as Bima Sakti, Kurniawan Dwi Yulianto to Aji Santoso. Meanwhile, Persija came to the final with strong capital after the last few seasons always competing at the top. In that season Persija performed excellently with stars such as Bambang Pamungkas and Luciano Leandro. In the match that was held at the Gelora Bung Karno Stadium, Persija managed to win over PSM with a narrow score of 3–2 and came out as champions.

2019 Indonesian Cup Finals

Leg 1
In Leg 1 of the Indonesian Cup Final at Gelora Bung Karno Stadium which was held on 21 July 2019, Persija defeated PSM with a narrow score of 1–0. Persija took the lead over PSM in the 88th minute, thanks to a goal scored by Ryuji Utomo. He received a pass from a corner kick by Riko Simanjuntak, then the kick along the ground by Ryuji Utomo went into the PSM goal guarded by Hilman Syah.

Leg 2
In Leg 2 of the 2019 Indonesia Cup Final at Mattoangin Stadium which was held on 6 August 2019, PSM managed to beat Persija with a score of 2–0. PSM Makassar scored a quick goal in the 3rd minute. Using a corner kick Wiljan Pluim, Aaron Evans's header managed to get into Persija's guarded goal Andritany Ardhiyasa. After winning, PSM did not relax the attack. However, Persija also occasionally launch attacks. PSM was increasingly pressing after Persija had to play with ten men in the 32nd minute. The second yellow card for Sandi Sute after violating Pluim forced him to leave the field. PSM's advantage increased in the 47th minute. Zulham Zamrun managed to head the ball from Aaron Evans which for the second time conceded the Persija goal which was guarded by Andritany Ardhiyasa. The final score of 2–0 made PSM Makassar the champion 2018–19 Indonesian Cup.

Supporters

Persija Jakarta
The Jakmania is the name for a group of football club supporters from the Jakarta, namely Persija Jakarta. The Jakmania is also one of the largest groups of football supporters in Indonesia.

PSM Makassar
PSM Makassar is known to have several groups of fanatical supporters, which are quite large, especially in Makassar City and other areas in South Sulawesi. Most of them are still there today, some of which are still active and their stands are:
The Maczman (East Stand)
Red Gank (North Stand)
Laskar Ayam Jantan (North Stand)
PSM Fans 1915 (South Stand)
Curva Sud Mattoanging (South Stand)
Makassar Supporter Collective (South Stand)
Ramang Mania (East Stand)
Komunitas Dottoro Suporter (South VIP Stand)

Clashes

2019 terror against Persija players in Makassar
Ahead of the second leg final match 2018 Indonesian Cup which brought together Persija Jakarta against the host team, PSM Makassar. Persija players reportedly received terror from a number of people while at their inn in Makassar City, South Sulawesi in the early hours of Saturday. Several unscrupulous PSM supporters carried out terrorist acts at the hotel where the Persija Jakarta players were staying. Then a Persija photographer, Yudhistira uploaded the video to Instagram. From the video, seen dozens of people lighting firecrackers accompanied by motorized vehicles flocking to the hotel where the players and officials of Persija Jakarta were staying.

2019 PSM supporters attack in Tebet
The attack on PSM Makassar supporters by Persija supporters took place at the Commander's Cafe located in Tebet, South Jakarta. At that time PSM supporters were holding a watch together at the PSM match against Persija in the Final 2018 Indonesian Cup. PSM who won the 2018 Indonesia Cup after winning 2–0 at Mattoangin Stadium, Makassar City on Tuesday 6th August 2019. This result avenged PSM's 0–1 defeat in the 1st leg at Persija headquarters and made PSM the 2018 Indonesia Cup champions. Persija supporters who did not accept Persija's defeat against PSM began attacking the location ofwatch together PSM supporters using stones and sharp weapons, Several PSM supporters were injured in the attack.

Honours

References

Persija Jakarta
PSM Makassar
Football rivalries in Indonesia
Football in Indonesia
Liga 1 (Indonesia)